Ismail Yusuf College, is the fourth oldest college of Mumbai, India. "I Y college", as it is popularly known, is managed by Government of Maharashtra. It is the oldest college in North Mumbai. It was established in 1930 with a large donation from Sir Mohammed Yusuf Ismail, K.T. on Jogeshwari Hill. The foundation stone was laid by Leslie Orme Wilson, Governor of Bombay in 1924.

Alumni
Kantilal Mardia, Mathematician and Statistician
A. R. Antulay, former Chief Minister of Maharashtra State
Rafiq Zakaria, Islamic Scholar and former Minister of Maharashtra State
P. L. Deshpande, Marathi playwright
Kader Khan, film artist
Habib Wali Mohammad, ghazal singer
Amroz Siddiqui, Maths Scholar, Teacher
Hamid Dalwai
Shankar Vaidya, Marathi Poet and former Marathi Professor of IYCollege

References

External links

Universities and colleges in Mumbai
Affiliates of the University of Mumbai
Educational institutions established in 1930
1930 establishments in India